Javon Liteff Walker (born October 14, 1978) is an American former professional football player who was a wide receiver in the National Football League (NFL). He was drafted by the Green Bay Packers 20th overall of the 2002 NFL Draft. He played college football for the Florida State Seminoles.

Walker also played for the Denver Broncos and Oakland Raiders. He was selected to the Pro Bowl with the Packers in 2004.

Walker attempted to start a clothing company called JWalk.

Early years
Javon played for St. Thomas More High School in Lafayette, Louisiana. Walker holds the record from his high school for most career touchdowns, most touchdowns in a game, and longest play from scrimmage. Walker was drafted by the Florida Marlins in the 12th round (366th overall) of the 1997 Major League Baseball draft, and spent three years in the minor leagues of the organization.

College career
Walker attended Jones County Junior College in Ellisville, Mississippi, where he was Deion Branch's teammate, before enrolling at Florida State University. He was also a triple jumper, with a best jump of 15.40 meters, and had a personal-best mark of 6.91 meters in the long jump.

Professional career

Green Bay Packers

 
After being drafted by the Green Bay Packers, Walker became the fourth player in NFL history to have 100 receiving yards in each of his first two playoff games (2002 vs. Atlanta, 2003 vs. Seattle). He was selected to the NFC's Pro Bowl team for the first time for the 2004 season, following a breakout year.

After the 2004 season, Walker, backed by new agent Drew Rosenhaus, stated that he would not play for the Green Bay Packers again and would retire if he was not traded. Walker had been at odds with the organization since management refused to renegotiate his contract that had two years remaining on it after his Pro Bowl season in 2004, when he caught 89 passes for 1,382 yards and 12 touchdowns. "I just don't like the way the organization runs itself", Walker told ESPN.com. "They want players to come up there and play hard and work hard, but when it comes time to be compensated, it's like, 'We forgot what you've done.'"  Walker also said quarterback Brett Favre's comments on his plans to hold out for a better contract last year made living in Wisconsin difficult, and he felt it was unfair that the team let Favre interfere with Walker's squabble with management. "There's an unwritten rule that players stick together," Walker said. Walker said he would not show up for training camp or come back at all for the final season of his contract regardless of whether Favre decided to retire or return. He said he'll repay the Packers the prorated portion of his signing bonus to leave Green Bay. "Why should I risk another year of getting beat up playing for a team that I don't want to play for? That's stupid", Walker said. Walker said he'll be ready for the 2006 season wherever he lands. "If I'm going to go out and take hits, it's going to be for a team that I love playing for", Walker said. "I'm not going to grandstand. I just want the Packers to give me peace of mind."

Ted Thompson released the following statement regarding the interview:

Walker eventually backed off of his threats to hold out and reported to camp.  In the first game of the 2005 season, Walker injured his ACL on a pass from Favre. The Packers placed Walker on injured reserve for the remainder of the season.

Denver Broncos
The Packers traded Walker to the Denver Broncos for a second round pick in the 2006 NFL Draft (later used by the Atlanta Falcons to select Jimmy F. Williams) on April 29, 2006. He signed a five-year deal worth more than $40 million, including roster bonuses totaling $15 million in 2007 and 2008. Walker recovered from his previous injury, and was productive during the 2006 season. He caught sixty-nine passes for 1,084 yards and eight touchdowns. Following the Broncos' season finale against the San Francisco 49ers, Walker was in a vehicle that was shot at in downtown Denver, killing teammate Darrent Williams. After Williams was shot, he fell into Walker's lap. In memory of Williams, Walker wore a hairstyle called the "fro-hawk", made famous by Williams, to begin the 2007 season. Walker said in an interview with Andrea Kremer of HBO's Real Sports that the attacks likely stemmed from a confrontation with bar patrons involving rookie wideout Brandon Marshall and his cousin.

On February 29, 2008, the Broncos released Walker after being unable to trade him.

Oakland Raiders
On March 4, 2008, the Oakland Raiders signed Walker to a six-year, $55 million contract that included $16 million in guaranteed money. In November 2008, Walker announced that he'd miss the rest of the season due to injury. For the season, Walker played in eight games, had 15 receptions for 196 yards and one touchdown.

For the 2009 season, Walker played in only three games and had no statistics. He was released by the team on March 8, 2010.

For his two seasons of employment with the Raiders, Walker collected $21 million.

Minnesota Vikings
On August 23, 2010, it was reported Walker would sign with the Minnesota Vikings, who had also tried out Brandon Jones to make up the depth at wide receiver. Jones would later sign with the Seattle Seahawks. The signing was largely brought about due to Sidney Rice undergoing hip surgery and missing half of the season and health concerns about Percy Harvin, who suffered from recurring migraines.

Walker was released September 5, 2010, before the regular season opener.

Suspension
On December 11, 2010, Walker was suspended by the NFL for four games. Although four-game suspensions were at that time handed out by the league for violating either the league's substance abuse policy or steroids policy, it was unclear which applied to Walker's situation.

NFL career statistics

Key
GP: games played
REC: receptions
ATT: rushing attempts
TGTS: targets
YDS: yards
AVG: yards per reception/return/rush
LNG: longest reception/return/rush
TD: touchdowns
FD: 1st downs
FUM: fumbles
LST: fumbles lost

Robbery incident
Just after 7 A.M. on June 16, 2008, Walker was found unconscious in Las Vegas, Nevada, on a street just off the Las Vegas Strip. The previous evening, he had been at Body English, a nightclub at the Hard Rock Hotel in Las Vegas, and left at approximately 5 A.M. the following morning. After being found unconscious, Walker was taken to a local hospital with what police described as "significant injuries," including a concussion. He was listed in fair condition and released from the hospital on June 18.

Police said Walker was the victim of an apparent robbery, as a large amount of cash and some jewelry were taken from him. Police arrested two suspects, one in late June (Arfat Fadel) and the other in early July. On July 7, 2010, Deshawn Lamont Thomas, an 11-time convicted felon, was sentenced to life imprisonment without the possibility of parole for his part in the crime.

References

External links

Denver Broncos bio
Green Bay Packers bio
Oakland Raiders bio
Football:

Baseball:

1978 births
Living people
Sportspeople from Galveston, Texas
Sportspeople from Lafayette, Louisiana
Players of American football from Texas
Players of American football from Louisiana
American football wide receivers
Jones County Bobcats football players
Florida State Seminoles football players
Green Bay Packers players
National Conference Pro Bowl players
Denver Broncos players
Oakland Raiders players
Gulf Coast Marlins players
Utica Blue Sox players